Dario Cecchi (1918–1992) was an Italian art director and costume designer.

Selected filmography

Art director
 Flesh Will Surrender (1947)
 Devotion (1950)
 Women Without Names (1950)
 In Olden Days (1952)
 The Beach (1954)
 Il Bidone (1955)
 Violent Summer (1959)
 The Savage Innocents (1960)
 Via Margutta (1960)
 To Bed or Not to Bed (1963)

Costume designer
 Fear and Sand (1948)
 Les Misérables (1948)
 The Pirates of Capri (1949)
 Tragic Spell (1951)
 Neapolitan Turk (1953)
 The Naked Maja (1958)
 The Best of Enemies (1961)
 Swordsman of Siena (1962)
 The Black Tulip (1964)
 Cyrano and d'Artagnan (1964)
 The Adventures of Gerard (1970)
 Come Have Coffee with Us (1970)

References

Bibliography
 Bayman, Louis. Directory of World Cinema: Italy. Intellect Books, 2011.

External links

1918 births
1992 deaths
Italian art directors
Italian costume designers
Film people from Florence